The 3rd Mini Album is the third work by South Korean singer Taegoon, released on September 17, 2009.

Singles
"Betrayed" was the first single to be released from the EP.  Comeback performance was on KBS's show Music Bank on September 18, 2009.

Track listing
 The Beginning (Feat 후니훈, 수앤) [(Feat. Hoony Hon, Sue Ann)]
 속았다 (Betrayed) (Narration Of 이요원) [Sogatda (Narration Of Lee Yo Won)]
 말해줘 (Tell Me) [Malhaejwo]
 Finally
 Step By Step

References

2009 EPs
Taegoon EPs